The sixth South American Junior Championships in Athletics were held in Montevideo, Uruguay from October 9–14, 1966.  For the first time, women's events were included.

Participation (unofficial)
Detailed result lists can be found on the "World Junior Athletics History" website.  An unofficial count yields the number of about 159 athletes from about 6 countries:  Argentina (36), Brazil (36), Chile (33), Paraguay (11), Peru (22), Uruguay (21).

Medal summary
Medal winners are published for men and women
Complete results can be found on the "World Junior Athletics History" website.

Men

* = another source states rather: Hexathlon

Women

Medal table (unofficial)

References

External links
 World Junior Athletics History

South American U20 Championships in Athletics
1966 in Uruguayan sport
South American U20 Championships
International athletics competitions hosted by Uruguay
1966 in youth sport